General Wade refers to George Wade (1673–1748), a British Army general. General Wade may also refer ro:

Ashton Wade (1898–1996), British Army major general
David Wade (Louisiana general) (1911–1990), U.S. Air Force lieutenant general 
Horace M. Wade (1916–2001), U.S. Air Force general 
James F. Wade (1843–1921), U.S. Army major general
Melancthon S. Wade (1801–1868), Union Army brigadier general
Sidney S. Wade (1909–2002), U.S. Marine Corps major general

See also
Attorney General Wade (disambiguation)